Gireesh Sahdev is an Indian film and television actor who appears in Hindi films and serials. He is best known for his roles in the serials Best of Luck Nikki, Navya..Naye Dhadkan Naye Sawaal, Ardhangini – Ek Khoobsurat Jeevan Saathi, Aladdin - Naam Toh Suna Hoga and Instant Khichdi. He has also appeared as a supporting actor in several films including Jab Tak Hai Jaan, Dabangg 2 and Khichdi: The Movie. His brother Piyush Sahdev and sister Meher Vij are also actors.

Personal life 
Gireesh Sahdev's brother Piyush, sister Meher and brother-in-law Manav Vij are also actors. In 2009, she married Manav Vij in Mumbai.

Filmography

Film

Television

Dubbing roles

Animated films

References

External links
 

Living people
Indian male television actors
Year of birth missing (living people)